Formosa is a former name for the island of Taiwan.

Formosa may also refer to:

Places and jurisdictions

Asia 
 Republic of Formosa, a short-lived republic in 1895 on the island of Formosa (also known as Taiwan)
 Dutch Formosa, the period of colonial Dutch government on Formosa (Taiwan), lasting from 1624 to 1662
 Spanish Formosa, a Spanish colony established in the north of Taiwan from 1626 to 1642
 Taiwan under Japanese rule, 1895 to 1945
 Formosa Strait, historic name for the Taiwan Strait
 Mount Formosa, a colonial-era name to a group of contiguous hills near Kanhangad, Kerala, India

Europe 
 Ria Formosa, a lagoon in the Algarve
 Formosa Island, Berkshire, England

South America 
 Formosa Province, Argentina
 Formosa, Argentina, the capital of its namesake province
 Roman Catholic Diocese of Formosa, Argentina
 Formosa, Goiás, Brazil (near Brasília in Goiás State)
 Roman Catholic Diocese of Formosa, Brazil, formerly a Territorial Prelature

North America 
 Formosa, Ontario, Canada
 Formosa, Arkansas, Van Buren County, Arkansas, United States

Africa 
 Formosa (Guinea-Bissau), one of the Bissagos Islands, Africa
 Formosa Flora, an earlier name for Bioko, Equatorial Guinea.
 Bahia Formosa, an earlier name for Plettenberg Bay, South Africa
 Formosa Peak, South Africa

Other uses

Taiwan-related 
 Formosa Magazine, a magazine of the Tangwai movement
 Formosa Plastics Corp, a major corporation in Taiwan
 Formosa Television, a major television network in Taiwan

Other 
 Formosa (band), a German hard rock band
 Formosa (film), a 2005 comedy
 Formosa (grape), a Portuguese wine grape
 Formosa (horse), winner of the English Fillies Triple Crown
 Formosa (surname), a surname common in Malta, Spain, Portugal and other Mediterranean countries
 Formosa Cafe, a famous restaurant in Hollywood, California
 Formosa, a fictional country located on the island of Taiwan, whose culture was invented by George Psalmanazar as a hoax
 Bosque Formosa Esporte Clube, a Brazilian football (soccer) club
 Amanita muscaria var. formosa, a variety of the fly agaric mushroom
 Nectouxia formosa, a species of flowering plant belonging to the family Solanaceae
 Formosa (bacterium), a genus of Flavobacteriaceae

People with the surname 
 Ric Formosa (born 1954), Australian composer and musician

See also 
 Formosan (disambiguation)
 Formoso (disambiguation)
 A Famosa, a colonial fortress in Malacca, Malaysia; controlled by Portugal (1511–1641), Netherlands (1641–1795), Britain (1795–1807)
 JW Formoza, a Polish military unit